John Joseph Merena (November 18, 1909 – March 9, 1977) was a left-handed pitcher in Major League Baseball in 1934. Merena pitched in four games for the Boston Red Sox, starting three of those games, completing two, and collecting his only win in a four-hit shutout over the rival New York Yankees. His career was over in the spring of 1935 due to a sore arm. His father, Jacob Kosmo Merena, had come from Nove Sonch (Nowy Sacz), Poland (it was Russia at the time), arriving in the United States in 1901. Jacob's wife Mary was a New York native, born to two Russian parents.

References

External links
Spike Merena - Baseball-Reference.com

1909 births
1977 deaths
Baseball players from Paterson, New Jersey
Major League Baseball pitchers
Boston Red Sox players
American people of Russian descent
American people of Polish descent